The 2010–11 season of the Israeli Futsal League was the 5th season of top-tier futsal under the Israel Football Association and 11th overall. The regular season started on 8 February 2011 and was concluded on 5 June 2011.

Yanshufei Agudat Sport Tel Aviv were the defending champions, but lost their title by losing in a deciding match to ASA Ben-Gurion University.

Format changes
For this season, the 10 clubs registered to play in the league, played each other in a double round-robin tournament, with the top club winning the championship. As two teams finished equal on points and number of victories, a deciding match was needed to set the league champions.

League table

Deciding match

External links
Israeli Futsal League 2010-2011 IFA

References

Israeli Futsal League
Futsal
Israel